Alsid Tafili (born 20 August 1987) is an Albanian footballer who plays for KF Besa Kavajë.

Club career
He announced to leave Partizani in January 2016, only to rejoin Vllaznia a day later.
In June 2019, Tafili rejoined Liria Prizren for the third time.

References

1987 births
Living people
Footballers from Shkodër
Albanian footballers
Association football midfielders
KF Vllaznia Shkodër players
KF Elbasani players
KS Ada Velipojë players
KF Tërbuni Pukë players
KF Laçi players
KF Liria players
KF Teuta Durrës players
Panachaiki F.C. players
FK Partizani Tirana players
KF Besa Kavajë players
Kategoria Superiore players
Kategoria e Parë players
Football Superleague of Kosovo players
Albanian expatriate footballers
Expatriate footballers in Kosovo
Albanian expatriate sportspeople in Kosovo
Expatriate footballers in Greece
Albanian expatriate sportspeople in Greece